This was the first edition of the tournament.

Ruben Bemelmans won the title after defeating Nils Langer 6–4, 3–6, 7–6(7–0) in the final.

Seeds

Draw

Finals

Top half

Bottom half

References
 Main Draw
 Qualifying Draw

Koblenz Open - Singles
2017 Singles